John Andrew Oulliber (February 24, 1911 – December 26, 1980) was a Major League Baseball outfielder who played for one season, who later became a banker. He played in 22 games for the Cleveland Indians during the 1933 Cleveland Indians season. He later became president of First Commerce Corporation, a bank in New Orleans.

Oulliber posted a .267 batting average (20-for-75) with 9 runs and 3 RBI. He handled 25 total chances in the outfield without an error for a 1.000 fielding percentage.

References

External links

 http://www.thebbnlive.com/PlayerInfoByKeyID.aspx?KeyID=oullijo01
 https://www.findagrave.com/memorial/47948186

1911 births
1980 deaths
Major League Baseball outfielders
Cleveland Indians players
Baseball players from Louisiana